Juris Grustiņš (born 22 July 1947) is a Latvian male former long-distance runner who competed in track events for the Soviet Union. He is the Latvian national record holder  in the 5000 metres with his career best of 13:34.2 minutes.

His greatest achievement was a gold medal in the 3000 metres at the 1972 European Athletics Indoor Championships. He was also twice national champion in that event, winning at the Soviet Indoor Athletics Championships in 1972 and 1973.

International competitions

National titles
Soviet Indoor Athletics Championships
3000 m: 1972, 1973

References

External links

Living people
1947 births
Latvian male long-distance runners
Soviet male long-distance runners